Thomas Michael de Glanville (born 10 December 1999) is an English professional rugby union player who plays at fly-half or fullback for Bath Rugby in the Gallagher Premiership. He is the son of  Yolanda and Phil de Glanville, the former captain of the England national rugby union team.

Career 
De Glanville attended school at Beechen Cliff School in Bath and joined Bath Rugby academy. After attaining 3 As at A-Level, he then moved to the University of Leeds to study Biology and was loaned to National League 2 North side Otley R.U.F.C. on a dual-registration whilst studying there. De Glanville then transferred to the University of Bath in order to keep training with Bath academy. In 2019, he captained Bath at the Premiership Sevens. Later in the year, he signed his first senior contract to play for the Bath Rugby senior team. He made his Premiership Rugby debut against Exeter Chiefs in September 2019.

International career
In the summer of 2017 De Glanville was a member of the England under-18 team that toured South Africa and the following year he scored two tries against Wales under-18 at Sardis Road. He scored a try for England under-20 against Scotland in the final round of the 2019 Six Nations Under 20s Championship. Later that year he was a member of the squad that finished fifth at the 2019 World Rugby Under 20 Championship and scored a try during the pool stage against Australia.

In October 2020 he was called up to a senior England training squad by head coach Eddie Jones.

Playing style
De Glanville has played in several positions in the backs. The Bath coach Todd Blackadder once said that de Glanville would play well at fly-half. However de Glanville often plays as a centre, following in his father's footsteps and having played there through several England age groups. He has also played at full-back for Bath United in the Premiership "A" League.

References 

1999 births
Living people
People educated at Beechen Cliff School
Bath Rugby players
English rugby union players
Rugby union fly-halves
Rugby union fullbacks
Rugby union players from Bath, Somerset